Local government elections took place in London, and some other parts of the United Kingdom on Thursday 4 May 2006. Polling stations were open between 7am and 10pm.

All London borough council seats were up for election.  Mayoral contests were held in the London Boroughs of Hackney, Lewisham, and Newham.

The London Conservatives slightly increased their vote share, made 131 council seat gains and won control of 6 new councils, while London Labour saw its vote share decline by 6% and lost 8 councils and 182 seats. The 2006 result was one of Labour's worst local election results in London, with its share of the vote (27.9%), its number of council seats (684) and number of councils (7) all at their lowest levels since 1968. Conversely, the Conservatives won the most seats, the most councils and the most votes in London for the first time since 1982.

The Labour decline was also accompanied by a rise in the number of minor party councillors, mostly concentrated in specific local authorities. Respect won 15 council seats, the British National Party won 14 and the London Green Party won 12. The Christian Peoples Alliance and the Socialist Party also won two seats each. In total, the election saw 76 minor party or independent councillors elected in London, a figure which remains the highest on record.

Altogether, minor parties and independents won 17% of the vote, the highest ever vote share for 'other' parties until the local elections of 2014.

Results summary

Turnout: 2,284,882 voters cast ballots, a turnout of 38.9% (+7.1%).

Council results

Overall councillor numbers
The largest party in terms of councils and councillors became the Conservative Party after this election, with losses by the Labour Party and a small increase in share of the vote to the Liberal Democrats.  Smaller national parties made significant gains, with the British National Party and Respect having the second-largest number of councillors in the London Borough of Barking and Dagenham and Tower Hamlets (respectively).  The Green Party also saw its gains concentrated on one area to achieve the third most councillors in the London Borough of Lewisham.  Scattered across boroughs, unaffiliated residents groups won 24 council seats.

|}

Mayoral results
In three London boroughs the executive function of the council is a directly elected mayor. The mayoral elections take place at the same time as councillor elections in those boroughs.

Ward result maps

London-wide 
The map below shows the results for each ward across the whole of Greater London.

By borough

References

 
May 2006 events in the United Kingdom
2006